Maria Willard Jackson (1830–?) was the wife of former Governor of West Virginia Jacob B. Jackson and served as that state's First Lady, 1881-1885.  She was born in 1830, at Pleasants County, West Virginia. In 1855, she married Jacob B. Jackson.  At the end of Jackson's term as governor the capital was moved from Wheeling to Charleston for the last time, so she was the last first lady to serve at Wheeling.  After leaving office, the Jacksons returned to Parkersburg, West Virginia.  Her date of death is unknown.

References

1830 births
People from Pleasants County, West Virginia
First Ladies and Gentlemen of West Virginia
Jackson family of West Virginia
Year of death missing
People from Parkersburg, West Virginia